is a subway station on the Toei Mita Line in Bunkyo, Tokyo, Japan, operated by the Tokyo subway operator Tokyo Metropolitan Bureau of Transportation (Toei). It is numbered "I-14"

Lines
Sengoku Station is served by the Toei Mita Line.

Layout
The station has one island platform serving two tracks. The station lies underneath Hakusan-dori and spans the space roughly from the Shinobazu-dori and Hakusan-dori crossing in the north-west to the branch of Hakusan-dori and Kyu-hakusan-dori in the south-east.

Platforms

History
The station opened on 30 June 1972.

See also

 List of railway stations in Japan

Railway stations in Japan opened in 1972
Railway stations in Tokyo
Toei Mita Line